The prime minister of Malaysia is the head of government of Malaysia. The prime minister directs the executive branch of the federal government. The Yang di-Pertuan Agong appoints the prime minister as a member of Parliament (MP) who, in his opinion, is most likely to command the confidence of a majority of MPs. This person is usually the leader of the party winning the most seats in a general election. 

After the formation of Malaysia on 16 September 1963, Tunku Abdul Rahman, the chief minister of the Federation of Malaya, became the first prime minister of Malaysia.

Appointment 

According to the Federal Constitution, the Yang di-Pertuan Agong shall first appoint a prime minister to preside over the Cabinet. The prime minister is to be a member of the Dewan Rakyat (House of Representatives), and who in his majesty's judgment is likely to command the confidence of the majority of the members of that House. This person must be a Malaysian citizen, but cannot have obtained their citizenship by means of naturalisation or registration. The Yang di-Pertuan Agong shall appoint other ministers from either the Dewan Rakyat or Dewan Negara (Senate) with the prime minister's advice.

The prime minister and his cabinet ministers must take and subscribe to the oath of office and allegiance as well as the oath of secrecy in the presence of the Yang di-Pertuan Agong before they can exercise functions of office. The Cabinet is collectively accountable to the Parliament of Malaysia. The members of the Cabinet shall not hold any office of profit and engage in any trade, business or profession that will cause a conflict of interest. The Prime Minister's Department (sometimes referred to as the Prime Minister's Office) is the body and ministry in which the prime minister exercises his/her functions and powers.

In the case where a government cannot get its appropriation (budget) legislation passed by the House of Representatives, or when the House passes a vote of "no confidence" in the government, the prime minister is bound by convention to resign immediately. The Yang di-Pertuan Agong's choice of replacement prime minister will be dictated by the circumstances. All other ministers shall continue to hold office by the pleasure of the Yang di-Pertuan Agong, unless if the appointment of any minister is revoked by his majesty upon the advice of the prime minister. Any minister may resign his office.

Following a resignation in other circumstances, defeat in an election, or the death of a prime minister, the Yang di-Pertuan Agong would generally appoint as the new leader of the governing party or coalition as new Prime Minister.

Malaysia uses first-past-the-post-voting system, which means a party or coalition who gets 112 seats in lower house will lead the government.

Powers 

The power of the prime minister is subject to a number of limitations. Prime ministers removed as leader of his or her party, or whose government loses a vote of no confidence in the House of Representatives, must advise a new election of the lower house or resign the office. The defeat of a supply bill (one that concerns the spending of money) or unable to pass important policy-related legislation is seen to require the resignation of the government or dissolution of Parliament, much like a non-confidence vote, since a government that cannot spend money is hamstrung, also called loss of supply.

The prime minister's party will normally have a majority in the House of Representatives and party discipline is exceptionally strong in Malaysian politics, so passage of the government's legislation through the House of Representatives is mostly a formality.

Under the Constitution, the prime minister's role includes advising the Yang di-Pertuan Agong on:
 the appointment of the federal ministers (full members of cabinet);
 the appointment of the federal deputy ministers, parliamentary secretaries (non-full members of cabinet);
 the appointment of 44 out of 70 Senators in the Dewan Negara;
 the summoning and adjournment of sittings of the Dewan Rakyat;
 the appointment of judges of the superior courts (which are the High Courts, the Court of Appeal, and the Federal Court);
 the appointment of the attorney-general and the auditor-general; and
 the appointment of the chairmen and members of the Judicial and Legal Service Commission, Election Commission, Police Force Commission, Education Service Commission, National Finance Council, and Armed Forces Council;

Under Article 39 of the Constitution, executive authority is vested in the Yang di-Pertuan Agong. However, Article 40(1) states that in most cases, the Yang di-Pertuan Agong is bound to exercise his powers on the advice of the Cabinet or a minister acting under the Cabinet's general authority. Thus, most of the day-to-day work of governing is actually done by the prime minister and the Cabinet.

Acting prime minister 
From time to time, prime ministers are required to leave the country on business and a deputy is appointed to take their place during that time. In the days before jet aeroplanes, such absences could be for extended periods. However, the position can be fully decided by the Yang di-Pertuan Agong, the King of Malaysia when the position remains empty following the sudden resignation or death of the prime minister.

Caretaker prime minister 
Under Article 55(3) of Constitution of Malaysia, the lower house of Parliament, unless sooner dissolved by the Yang di-Pertuan Agong with his own discretion on the advice of the prime minister, shall continue for five years from the date of its first meeting. Article 55(4) of the Constitution permits a delay of 60 days of general election to be held from the date of dissolution and Parliament shall be summoned to meet on a date not later than 120 days from the date of dissolution. Conventionally, between the dissolution of one Parliament and the convening of the next, the prime minister and the cabinet remain in office in a caretaker capacity.

Interim prime minister 
The office of interim prime minister was created by the king before the appointment of the new prime minister during the 2020 Malaysian political crisis. However, caretaker prime minister is mentioned as the cabinet tendered resignation to the king until a new prime minister is appointed.

List of prime ministers of Malaysia
Colour key (for political coalitions/parties):
 (2) 
 (6) 
 (2) 
 (1)

Timeline

Notes

List of acting prime ministers of Malaysia 

Colour key (for political parties):

List of interim or caretaker prime ministers of Malaysia 

Colour key (for political parties):

See also 
 Air transports of heads of state and government
 Official state car
 Spouse of the Prime Minister of Malaysia
 Leader of the Opposition (Malaysia)
 Chief Ministers in Malaysia

Notes

References 

Malaysia
 
Prime Ministers
1957 establishments in Malaya